Gretchen Cryer (née Kiger; born October 17, 1935) is an American playwright, lyricist, and actress.

Early life
Cryer was born Gretchen Kiger in Dunreith, Indiana, the daughter of Louise Geraldine (née Niven; 1911-1991) and Earl William "Bill" Kiger, Jr. (1911-2004), who sold school supplies and ran a home printing business. Cryer attended DePauw University as an English major.

Career

In one of her music classes, she met Nancy Ford, and the two forged a friendship that eventually led to a number of professional collaborations as the first female composer-lyricist team in Off-Broadway and Broadway New York theater. Their first work, For Reasons of Royalty, was produced at DePauw University and their musical Rendezvous was done at Boston University.

Their first professional New York production was Now Is The Time For All Good Men (1967), a highly political piece about Cryer's pacifist brother, who spent time as a teacher in a conservative mid-western high school, that was panned by the critics. Undaunted, they mounted The Last Sweet Days of Isaac – with Austin Pendleton and Fredricka Weber – in 1970, winning not only rave reviews, but the Obie, Drama Desk, and Outer Critics Circle Awards as well.

From there they moved to Broadway, but the musical, Shelter (1973), was not a success, despite a few good reviews. It would prove to be their only Broadway production. Using the pseudonym Sally Niven (Niven is her mother's maiden name), Cryer played the leading role in "Now Is the Time ..." opposite her real-life husband, David.  Dagne Crane had originally been cast in the part, but left shortly before the opening to become a regular on the soap opera "As the World Turns".

Cryer and Ford's most notable success was I'm Getting My Act Together and Taking It on the Road (1978), based on Cryer's life experiences. She not only co-wrote the piece, but performed in it as well. Despite being lambasted by the critics, the show began to find an audience via word-of-mouth, and producer Joseph Papp moved it from his Public Theater in lower Manhattan to the Circle in the Square Downtown (where it ran from 12/14/1978 to 3/15/1981 ) . Cryer and Ford's latest musical, Einstein and the Roosevelts, premiered at DePauw University in October 2008.

Cryer appeared in the 1987 film Hiding Out as the aunt of her real-life son, Jon Cryer.

Cryer's additional work as a performer included roles on Broadway in Little Me (1962), 110 in the Shade (1963) and 1776 (1969).

Personal life

Cryer and her husband, actor/singer David Cryer, divorced in 1971. She has two daughters – Robin, who has appeared with her in cabaret shows, and Shelley, who is a theatrical make-up artist. Her son is film and television actor Jon Cryer.

Cryer is a member of Kappa Kappa Gamma.

References

External links
 

1935 births
Actresses from Indiana
American musical theatre actresses
American musical theatre lyricists
DePauw University alumni
Living people
People from Henry County, Indiana
Songwriters from Indiana
Yale University alumni
American women dramatists and playwrights
20th-century American dramatists and playwrights
20th-century American actresses
20th-century American singers
20th-century American women writers
21st-century American dramatists and playwrights
21st-century American women writers
Writers from Indiana
20th-century American women singers